A cuddle or hug is a near universal form of physical intimacy.

Cuddle may also refer to:
Cuddle (EP), extended play by Stikky
Cuddle (horse), New Zealand Thoroughbred racemare